Lung recruitment maneuvers are efforts to open collapsed areas of the lungs and keep them open. They are primarily used in acute respiratory distress syndrome (ARDS).

References

Respiratory system procedures